The King and Maxwell book series is a crime novel book series created by David Baldacci. There are currently six books in the series featuring two former Secret Service agents Sean King and Michelle Maxwell.

Books

Split Second

Book information
Publication Date: September 30, 2003

Pages: 482 (Mass Market Paperback)

Hour Game

Publication information
Publication Date: October 26, 2004

Pages: 736 (Hardcover)

Simple Genius

Publication information
Publication Date: April 24, 2007

Pages: 420 (Hardcover)

First Family

Publication information
Publication Date: April 21, 2009

Pages: 464 (Hardcover)

The Sixth Man

Notes
This book has been adapted into the King & Maxwell TV series on TNT.

Publication information
Publication Date: April 19, 2011

Pages: 417 (Hardcover)

King and Maxwell

Publication information
Publication Date: November 19, 2013

Pages: 432 (Hardcover)

References

Novels by David Baldacci